Başkent Volleyball Hall, is an indoor volleyball venue within the TVF Sports Complex located at Beşevler neighborhood of Yenimahalle district in Ankara, Turkey. Opened in 2010, the venue has a seating capacity of 7,600 spectators.

Construction
The sports complex was commissioned by the Turkish Volleyball Federation and its construction began on 8 April 2009 with groundbreaking. The hall was opened on 6 February 2010 and named after "capital city".

In addition to the Başkent Volleyball Hall, there are one training hall with 850-seat capacity, named Beşevler Volleyball Hall, two indoor beach volleyball courts with underfloor heating, various service facilities for sports and administration as well as a hall of fame.

Usage
As of July 2016 the facility has been exposed by Amnesty International as a government detention centre and torture facility for almost 10,000 soldiers involved in the failed coup d'état that was attempted by an as yet undisclosed secular anti-ISIS movement. where soldiers are being raped, beaten, and deprived of food and water with an as yet unknown death toll.

International events hosted
2010
2010 Women's European Volleyball League Final Four – 24–25 July 2010
2011
2011 Men's European Volleyball Championship Qualification
2011 FIVB Girls Youth World Championship – 12–21 August 2011
2012
2012 Men's European Volleyball League-Final Four 30 June-1 July 2012
2012 Women's Junior European Volleyball Championship – 18–26 August 2012
2013 Men's European Volleyball Championship qualification Second round-Pool A-Tournament 2 matches – 14–16 September 2012
2013
2013 FIVB World Grand Prix-Pool C 2–4 August 2013
2013 FIVB Volleyball Men's U21 World Championship-Pool A, B and Final Round 22 August-1 September 2013
2014
2014 FIVB Volleyball Women's World Championship qualification (CEV)- Third round Pool 1 3–5 January 2014
2013–14 CEV Champions League-Final four 22–23 March 2014
2014 FIVB World Grand Prix-Pool A and E 1–3 August and 8–10 August 2014
2015
2015 FIVB Volleyball World Grand Prix – Pool C 3–5 July 2015
2015 Women's European Volleyball League – Leg 2 7–9 August 2015
2015 FIVB Volleyball Women's U23 World Championship 12–19 August 2015
2016
Volleyball at the 2016 Summer Olympics – Women's European qualification 4–9 January
2016 FIVB Volleyball World Grand Prix – Pool G1 24–26 June
2017
2017 FIVB Volleyball World League – Pool C2 2–4 June
2017 FIVB Volleyball World Grand Prix – Pool A1 7–9 July

See also
List of indoor arenas in Turkey

References

External links

Venue's page on TVF website

Sports venues in Ankara
Sports venues completed in 2010
Volleyball venues in Turkey
Yenimahalle, Ankara